The Mirror Explodes is the fifth full-length album by American psychedelic rock band the Warlocks. It was released on May 19, 2009 by record label Tee Pee. The album is produced by Rod Cervera, who had previously worked on the band's albums Rise and Fall and Heavy Deavy Skull Lover.

Track listing 

 "Red Camera" - 5:30
 "The Midnight Sun" - 4:27
 "Slowly Disappearing" - 4:52
 "There Is a Formula to Your Despair" - 4:43
 "Standing Between the Lovers of Hell" - 5:48
 "You Make Me Wait" - 5:54
 "Frequency Meltdown" - 6:10
 "Static Eyes" - 5:43

References 

2009 albums
The Warlocks albums
Tee Pee Records albums